The 1913–14 season was the 40th season of competitive football played by Rangers.

Overview
Rangers played a total of 44 competitive matches during the 1913–14 season. They finished runners-up in the Scottish League Division One after winning 27 of the 38 league matches.

Results
All results are written with Rangers' score first.

Scottish League Division One

Scottish Cup

Appearances

See also
 1913–14 in Scottish football

References

Rangers F.C. seasons
Rangers